Oikobesalon is an ichnogenus of unbranched, elongate burrows 
(a type of trace fossil) in originally soft substrate. The burrows are unbranched and straight, single-entrance with circular 
to elliptical cross-section. They are covered with thin mineralized lining. The burrow lining has a transverse ornamentation 
in the form of fusiform annulation. The earliest Oikobesalon traces are known from the Cambrian.

References

Burrow fossils